The fourteenth season of the American animated television series South Park began airing in the United States on Comedy Central between March 17, 2010, and November 17, 2010. The season was headed by the series creators Trey Parker and Matt Stone, who served as executive producers along with Anne Garefino. The season continued to focus on the exploits of protagonists Stan, Kyle, Cartman, Kenny, and Butters in the fictional Colorado mountain town of South Park.

The season was the second of three new seasons Parker and Stone agreed to produce for the network under a renewal deal. It consisted of fourteen 22-minute episodes, which aired in two groups of seven episodes separated by a six-month gap. Continuing their practice from previous seasons, Parker and Stone wrote and produced each episode within the week before its broadcast date. Parker was the director and writer for all episodes in the fourteenth season.

The season lampooned various topics, including the legalization of medical marijuana and the Deepwater Horizon oil spill. The season also parodied various cultural touchstones, such as The Catcher in the Rye, Tron, Facebook, Jersey Shore, Hoarders, and Inception. The parody of celebrities, a South Park tradition, continued in the fourteenth season, with depictions of Tiger Woods, Kim, Kourtney and Khloé Kardashian, Sarah Jessica Parker, and the devotion of the entire episodes of "200" and "201" to past celebrities suing the town of South Park for defamation. The original broadcasts of "200" and "201" were altered to censor depictions of the Islamic prophet Muhammad, to protect from threats delivered by radical Islamic extremists, which resulted in strong criticism against Comedy Central.

The fourteenth season received mixed to positive reviews, with some reviewers deeming it as an important season in the series' history, and others regarding it as progressively weak and stale. The season maintained the average Nielsen rating viewership for the series, around 3 million viewers per episode, with a slight decline in the latter half of the season. The episodes "200" and "201" were nominated for the 2010 Emmy Award for Outstanding Animated Program (for Programming Less Than One Hour).

Blackwater spoof
To promote the new season, the show aired commercials showing Cartman attempting to purchase 500 AK-47s.  The commercial aired after it was revealed that members of the "private security firm Blackwater had diverted hundreds of AK-47s and pistols from a U.S. weapons bunker in Afghanistan to Afghan policemen. Whoever signed for the weapons from Blackwater did so under a fake name: Eric Cartman."

During an interview with the Huffington Post, Trey Parker said: “It makes perfect sense. It’s the name I would use. Our first reaction to any story is ‘How do we put this into the show?’ and the second reaction is ‘Did Cartman do that?’ because he’s so real to us it’s like ‘I bet Cartman did that.’” Matt Stone agreed, saying “I saw that and thought, ‘Wow, Cartman did that? That’s pretty cool. Sounds like something he would do.’”

Episodes

Reception

Reviews 

Ramsey Isler of IGN cited the fourteenth season as an important season, writing that the quality of the episodes are signs that "the future of the series is far from bleak." In a section describing the impact of "200" and "201", Isler asserted that, for a time, "South Park became more than just a cartoon with foul-mouthed kids – it became a symbol of the kind of terrorism and fear that have become so prevalent in today's world." He believed that the heavy-handed censorship brought the series to the forefront of social conversation for a while, but also seemed to have killed some of the enthusiasm during the season's second half. He named the "Coon" three-parter as a highlight, admitting, "The arc wasn't exactly the most hilarious stuff the show has ever produced, but it did have some brilliant ideas that were executed very well."

Many other reviewers found the show dipped in consistency during its fourteen season. Slants Kris King gave the season a very mixed review, attributing it to the show's "forced social commentary," lamenting, "At what point did the creators of South Park stop being the sharp voices of a younger generation and start sounding like ornery parents?" Another Slant reviewer, Chris Cabin, commented that "the amount of laughs overall has negligibly diminished [...] the show's durability isn't exactly what it used to be." He believed that the fourteenth season stood as a strong display of the technical advancements the show has undergone since its premiere.

Ratings 
The fourteenth season of South Park generally maintained the average Nielsen rating viewership for the series, around 3 million viewers per episode, with a slight drop-off in the second half of the season. The season premiere, "Sexual Healing", was seen in 3.74 million households, the largest audience for South Park since the third season premiere "Rainforest Shmainforest" in 1999. "Sexual Healing" proved to be the most-watched episode of the season, and the night of its premiere heralded the highest ratings of the entire year for Comedy Central. The two-part episode "200" and "201" also received high ratings (at 3.33 and 3:50 million viewers, respectively), perhaps due in part to their high controversy. "Crippled Summer", the follow-up episode, featured the second-highest ratings of the season, at 3.55 million viewers. When the series returned for the second half of season fourteen in the fall, "It's a Jersey Thing" received the highest ratings, at 3.25 million viewers.

The fourteenth season of South Park received its lowest viewership in the episodes "Crème Fraiche", seen in 2.49 million households; "Coon 2: Hindsight", seen in 2.76 million households; and "Coon vs. Coon and Friends", seen in 2.79 million households. The ratings of "Crippled Summer" outperformed those of several primetime network shows the evening of its original broadcast.

Controversy 

"200" and "201" celebrate the series' arrival at two hundred episodes, and, as a result feature a heavy degree of reference to past South Park episodes, storylines, characters and controversies. The episodes attempt to feature a depiction of Muhammed, which Parker and Stone attempted to feature in the season ten (2006) two-parter "Cartoon Wars", but were censored. Shortly after "200" original broadcast, the website for the organization Revolution Muslim, a New York-based radical Muslim organization, posted an entry that included a warning to Parker and Stone that they risk violent retribution for their depictions of Muhammad. It said that they "will probably wind up like Theo van Gogh for airing this show." Filmmaker Theo van Gogh was murdered by an Islamic extremist in 2004 for making a short documentary on violence against women in some Islamic societies. The posting provided the addresses to Comedy Central in New York and the production company in Los Angeles. Posted by Zachary Adam Chesser (who preferred to be called Abu Talhah al Amrikee), several media outlets and observers interpreted it as a threat.

The following week, "201" faced a heavy degree of publicity. Before "201" aired, the New York City Police Department increased security at the Comedy Central headquarters in direct response to the threats. Law enforcement officials said Revolution Muslim itself was "all talk" and had never engaged in any actual violence but they were concerned that the website post could inspire violence from others. During the episode's first and only broadcast, all references to Muhammad's name were replaced by audio bleeps. Several other portions of dialogue were also censored, including almost the entirety of a monologue spoken by Kyle at the end regarding the moral of the episode (reportedly about "intimidation and fear.") Muhammad's name appeared in the previous episode, "200", without any such censorship. Both episodes obscured all images of what was apparently Muhammad with a black "CENSORED" box. Immediately after the episode "201" aired, the series website South Park Studios posted a notice that said Comedy Central had inserted "numerous additional bleeps throughout the episode" after Parker and Stone submitted their final cut to the network. The network later confirmed they were responsible for the audio censorship, as well as obscuring images of Muhammad. "201" has not aired since its original debut as South Park would usually repeat during the week, and episodes from earlier in the season were shown instead. Although South Park Studios generally makes unexpurgated versions of their episodes immediately available to view, the notice indicated Parker and Stone did not have network approval to show their original version, and thus no version of "201" could be seen on the website. The Canadian Comedy Network aired "201" on April 25, 2010, though the episode was censored as the American broadcast was, breaking the network's multi-year practice of airing South Park completely uncensored. In addition, "200" and "201" were not broadcast in the Netherlands, or Sweden.

The censorship of "201" brought strong criticism to Comedy Central. Some commentators suggested because Comedy Central responded to Revolution Muslim's warnings by censoring depictions of Muhammad, the Muslim extremists scored a significant public victory. As a result of Revolution Muslim's statement, Seattle cartoonist Molly Norris suggested that many people draw and publish pictures of Muhammad on May 20, 2010, which she dubbed Everybody Draw Mohammed Day, which also resulted in major criticism and controversy. Chesser was arrested in July 2010 after attempting to board a flight to Somalia to join terrorist organization Al-Shabaab, and, in October, was sentenced to 25 years in prison for communicating threats to Parker and Stone, soliciting violent jihadists to desensitize law enforcement, and attempting to provide material support to a designated foreign terrorist organization.

On January 31, 2014, the original uncensored version of "201" was illegally leaked online without the approval of Comedy Central. The speech at the end was, appropriately, a deadpan statement that making threats is an effective way to get what you want; essentially "terrorism works."

Dutch spinoff prank 
In February 2010, it was announced that Comedy Central Netherlands would begin airing a live-action spin-off of the show called The Real South Park in April 2010. The show was said to feature a cast of Dutch children reprising the roles of Stan, Kyle, Cartman and Kenny, with American actors providing English voice-overs. However, this turned out to be an elaborate April Fools' Day joke, with a Dutch television magazine reporting on the filming of the series in Amsterdam being in on the joke. Broadcast on April 1, it showed a short skit of the four boys traveling to Amsterdam and visiting the red-light district, ending with Kenny being hit and killed by a passing tram. The texts "1 april" and "there is only one real South Park" then appeared on screen, after which the first episode of season 14 started.

Award nominations 
Episodes "200" and "201", from season fourteen were nominated for the Primetime Emmy Award for Outstanding Animated Program in 2010, but lost to the ABC animated Christmas special, Prep & Landing.

Home media
Season fourteen was released by Paramount Home Entertainment in the United States on April 26, 2011, on both DVD (as a three-disc set) and Blu-ray (as a two-disc set). Each set includes all fourteen episodes in 1080p video and Dolby TrueHD, as well as brief audio commentaries by Parker and Stone for each episode. The set also includes the season thirteen episode "The Coon", as a special "bonus episode".

While twelve of the episodes are uncensored, episode "200" has the image of Muhammad censored, and the controversial episode "201" is shown in its original broadcast version, preceded by a disclaimer including a statement released by Trey Parker and Matt Stone on April 22, 2010. During the commentary in both "200" and "201" Parker and Stone never mention Muhammad directly, referring to him only as "the prophet of the Muslim faith". Despite the package claiming otherwise, both "200" and "201" were omitted from the Region 4 release and have been completely omitted from the Region 2 release as well.

References

External links 
 South Park Studios – official website with streaming video of full episodes.
 South Park Studios – official website for UK and Ireland, with new episode alerts, exclusive preview clips and all the news straight from South Park Studios
 South Park Studios official website for Germany and Austria with streaming video of full episodes.
 South Park Studios – official website for The Netherlands with the same features as the one for UK.
 The Comedy Network – full episodes for Canada

 

2010 American television seasons